Oncidium raniferum is a species of orchid endemic to eastern Brazil.

References

External links 

raniferum
Endemic orchids of Brazil